Studzieniec may refer to the following places:
Studzieniec, Sierpc County in Masovian Voivodeship (east-central Poland)
Studzieniec, Subcarpathian Voivodeship (south-east Poland)
Studzieniec, Świętokrzyskie Voivodeship (south-central Poland)
Studzieniec, Żyrardów County in Masovian Voivodeship (east-central Poland)
Studzieniec, Chodzież County in Greater Poland Voivodeship (west-central Poland)
Studzieniec, Oborniki County in Greater Poland Voivodeship (west-central Poland)
Studzieniec, Lubusz Voivodeship (west Poland)
Studzieniec, Warmian-Masurian Voivodeship (north Poland)